The Ringer is a 1952 British mystery film directed by Guy Hamilton and starring Herbert Lom, Donald Wolfit, Mai Zetterling, Greta Gynt, William Hartnell, and Denholm Elliott. It was Hamilton's directorial debut and the third English-language sound version of Edgar Wallace's 1929 play. It was shot at Shepperton Studios near London. The film's sets were designed by the art director William Hutchinson.

Premise
An underhand solicitor receives threatening notes from a mysterious killer who's also a master of disguise, and the police are called in to protect him.

Cast

 Herbert Lom as Maurice Meister
 Donald Wolfit as Dr. Lomond
 Mai Zetterling as Lisa
 Greta Gynt as Cora Ann Milton
 William Hartnell as Sam Hackett
 Denholm Elliott as John Lemley
 Norman Wooland as Inspector Bliss
 Dora Bryan as Mrs. Hackett
 Charles Victor as Inspector Wembury
 Walter Fitzgerald as Commissioner
 John Stuart as Gardener
 John Slater as Bell
 Edward Chapman as Stranger
 Campbell Singer as Station Sergeant Carter
 Arthur Lovegrove as Workman installing window bars (uncredited)
 Robert Raglan (uncredited)

Critical reception
Allmovie wrote, "Donald Wolfit, whose legendary thespic excesses were later fictionalized in the stage play The Dresser, is perfectly cast as a vengeance-seeking master of disguise". TV Guide noted "old-fashioned melodrama with an excellent cast."

See also
 The Ringer (1928)
 The Ringer (1931)
 The Ringer (Der Hexer, 1932)
 The Gaunt Stranger (1938)
 Der Hexer (1964)

References

External links

1952 films
1950s mystery films
Films directed by Guy Hamilton
British mystery films
British films based on plays
Films based on works by Edgar Wallace
1952 directorial debut films
British black-and-white films
Films shot at Shepperton Studios
British Lion Films films
Films set in London
Remakes of British films
1950s English-language films
1950s British films